Beautiful Friendship is an album by flautist Elise Wood and pianist John Hicks, recorded in 2000.

Recording and music
The album was recorded in New York City on February 20 and November 15, 2000.

Release
Beautiful Friendship was released by HiWood.

Reception

The Penguin Guide to Jazz commented that Wood's "broad vibrato is heard front and centre in a set of sentimental ballads that rarely rises above easy listening." The AllMusic reviewer concluded that, "It's easy to understand why they enjoy making music together after hearing this delightful disc."

Track listing
"Autumn in New York"
"A Beautiful Friendship"
"But Beautiful"
"Corcovado"
"Sophisticated Lady"
"April in Paris"
"My Romance"
"Skylark"
"Bewitched, Bothered and Bewildered"
"Afternoon in Paris"
"Some Other Time"

Personnel
John Hicks – piano
Elise Wood – flute

References

John Hicks (jazz pianist) albums
2000 albums